Dahlerup is a Danish surname.

Notable people
Notable people with this surname include:
 Drude Dahlerup (born 1945), Danish-Swedish political scientist
 Ulla Dahlerup (born 1942), Danish journalist
 Vilhelm Dahlerup (1836-1907), Danish architect

Other
 Dahlerup Warehouse, Copenhagen, Denmark

See also
Camilla Dallerup

Danish-language surnames